The 1983 Houston Cougars football team represented the University of Houston during the 1983 NCAA Division I-A football season. The Cougars were led by 22nd-year head coach Bill Yeoman and played their home games at the Astrodome in Houston, Texas. The team competed as members of the Southwest Conference, finishing in seventh. Houston finished the season with a record of 4–7, their first losing season since 1975.

Schedule

Source:

References

Houston
Houston Cougars football seasons
Houston Cougars football